Corneliu Porumboiu (born 14 September 1975) is a Romanian film director, screenwriter, and film producer.

Life and education

Corneliu Porumboiu was born in Vaslui, Vaslui County, Romania. He is the son of a former Romanian language teacher and a former football referee , currently a businessman.

Between 1994 and 1998 he attended the faculty of Management at ASE University Bucharest.

In 1999, he started studying film directing at the National University of Theatrical Arts and Cinematography Bucharest which he graduates in 2003. With his graduation short movie, A trip to the city, he gets prize II in the Cinefondation section at Cannes International Film Festival.

In October 2021 he was under investigation for fiscal fraud and money laundering by the DIICOT.

Career

After graduating UNATC, in 2004, he realizes his first medium-length film The Dream of Liviu. Also in 2004 he sets up, together with Marcela Ursu, the production house 42 km FILM.
 
In 2005, Corneliu writes and directs his first feature film 12:08 East of Bucharest selected in Quinzaine des Realisateurs where he obtained the Camera d'Or Award. The film received over 20 prizes in festivals around the world and was distributed in more than 30 territories.

In 2009, is launched Police, adjective, the second film written and directed by Corneliu Porumboiu. The film won the Jury Award at the Cannes International Film Festival in the Un Certain Regard section.

In 2013, the third feature When evening falls on Bucharest or Metabolism, signed by Corneliu Porumboiu, had its premiere at the Locarno Film Festival.

In 2014, he directs a sports documentary – The second game that was presented in the Berlin Forum.

In 2015, his next fiction film, The Treasure, is awarded with A Certain Talent in the Un Certain Regard section of the Cannes International Film Festival.

In 2018, he realizes a second documentary-Infinite Football-which premiered in the Berlin Forum section.
 
In 2019, he finishes his fifth fiction film – La Gomera/The Whistlers which had the world premiere in the Official Competition of the 72 edition of the Cannes International Film Festival.

Personal life

Porumboiu is married to Arantxa Etcheverria, a visual artist of French origin. They have two children together. In the production of his newest feature films, The Treasure and The Whistlers, Arantxa participated as artistic director.

Prizes

 2004: SECOND Prize in the Cinefondation section at the Cannes Film Festival with his short-movie A trip to the City
 2006: Caméra d'Or Prize and The "Transilvania" Trophy at TIFF 2006 for the movie 12:08 East of Bucharest.
 2007: Gopo Award for Best directing at the Gopo Gala for the film 12:08 East of Bucharest.
 2009: At the Cannes Film Festival, the movie, Police, adjective (2009) by Corneliu Porumboiu, was awarded with the FIPRESCI Prize and the Jury Award at the Un Certain Regard section.
 2014: Winner in the Best Romanian film section in TIFF and nominations for Best Directing, Best Feature, Best Documentary in the Gopo Awards with The second game film.
 2015: Winner in the Best Romanian film section in TIFF, A Certain Talent at the Un Certain Regard section in Cannes, FIPRESCI Award for Best Film and Best Screenplay award at Cairo International Film Festival with The Treasure movie.
 2018: Winner of the award for Best Documentary at the Jerusalem Film Festival, with the movie Infinite Football.
 2019: Winner of the award for Best Screenplay at the Seville Festival with the film La Gomera/The Whistlers.

Filmography

As director 

 Pe aripile vinului (2002)
  (2003) (won Second Prize of the Cinéfondation in 2004)
 Visul lui Liviu (2004)
 12:08 East of Bucharest (2006) (A fost sau n-a fost?)
 Police, Adjective (2009)
 When Evening Falls on Bucharest or Metabolism (2013)
 The Second Game (2014)
 The Treasure (Comoara) (2015)
 Infinite Football (Fotbal Infinite) (2018)
 The Whistlers (or La Gomera) (2019)

 As screenwriter 

 Pe aripile vinului (2002)
  (2003) (won Second Prize of the Cinéfondation in 2004)
 Visul lui Liviu (2004)
 12:08 East of Bucharest (2006) (A fost sau n-a fost?)
 Police, Adjective (2009)
 When Evening Falls on Bucharest or Metabolism (2013)
 The Unsaved (2013, writer)
 The Second Game (2014)
 The Treasure (Comoara) (2015)
 Infinite Football (Fotbal Infinit) (2018) The Whistlers (or La Gomera) (2019)

 As film producer 

 12:08 East of Bucharest (2006) (A fost sau n-a fost?)
 Police, Adjective'' (2009)

References

External links

Entrevista em Português (2011)

1975 births
People from Vaslui
Living people
Romanian film directors
Romanian screenwriters
Directors of Caméra d'Or winners